Temperance Hall was an assembly hall in Dedham, Massachusetts associated with the temperance movement.

History
After the creation of Norfolk County in 1793, a new courthouse was ordered to be constructed.
The First Church and Parish in Dedham then offered a piece of land on their Little Common, but construction was sluggish. It was not completed until 1795. It was found to be too small, however, and the ceilings were so low as to stifle people in the courtrooms. Charles Bulfinch was hired in 1795 to design a turret for the building and Paul Revere was commissioned to cast a bell.

After a new Norfolk County Courthouse was constructed in 1827, the old building was sold at public auction to Harris Monroe and Erastus Worthington. The pair speculated that the Town may want to use it as a town hall, and so they dragged it south down Court Street to a new lot. The Town decided to build an entirely new structure, however, on Bullard Street.

Worthington and Monroe then rented out the first floor, which had been used as county offices, as a retail space and apartment. It was used for a long time after that as a millinery shop. The second floor, which had the old courtroom, was converted into an assembly hall. In 1845, it was sold again to the Temperance Hall Association.

Use as Temperance Hall

The Temperance Hall Association, which was part of the temperance movement that opposed alcohol, extended the second floor by building an addition propped up by stilts that extended into the back yard. The hall was rented out to a great number of organizations. Among the groups using the hall were ventriloquists, magicians, a painted panorama entitled "The Burning of Moscow," a glassblowing exhibition, a demonstration of a model volcano called "The Eruption of Vesuvius," plays, concerts, including one by the Mendelssohn String Quartet, lectures, fundraisers, debates, bell ringers, and marching sessions by a para-military drill club. Among the speakers who took the podium there were Theodore Parker, Oliver Wendell Holmes, Frederick Douglass, Horace Mann, Father Matthew, and Abraham Lincoln.

By 1846, the Catholic community in Dedham was well established enough that the town became part of the mission of St. Joseph's Church in Roxbury. The flood of Irish immigrants escaping the Great Famine necessitated celebrating Mass in Temperance Hall, often by Father Patrick O'Beirne. At the outset of the American Civil War, a meeting in the hall was held to recruit men to fight.

It was later owned by George Alden who also ran a grocery store on the first floor. The building burned down on April 28, 1891.

Fenian raid
Following the Civil War, the local chapter of the Fenian Brotherhood, which had offices in the nearby Norfolk House, hosted a meeting in which a Fenian raid into Canada was organized. John R. Bullard, a recent Harvard Law School graduate, was elected moderator of the meeting and, having been swept up in his own sudden importance and fever of the meeting, ended his animated speech by asking "Who would be the first man to come forward and pledge himself to go to Canada and help free Ireland?" The first of the roughly dozen men to sign the "enlistment papers" were Patrick Donohoe and Thomas Golden. Thomas Brennan said he could not participate, but donated $50 to the cause. The meeting ended with the group singing "The Wearing of the Green."

The raid was a failure. Some of the men got as far as St. Albans, Vermont, but none made it to Canada. A few were arrested and some had to send home for money. Around the same time, Patrick Ford, the treasurer of the Brotherhood, absconded to South America with the organization's money.

Notes

References

Works cited

Buildings and structures in Dedham, Massachusetts
History of Dedham, Massachusetts
1845 establishments in Massachusetts
1891 disestablishments in Massachusetts
Prohibition in the United States